Nikola Jokanović (1961 – 26 November 2006) was a South African-Serbian professional basketball player and coach.

Career 
Jokanović started his playing career with a Užice-based team Prvi Partizan (nowadays Sloboda Užice). In 1980, he joined Crvena zvezda where he played for five seasons, until 1985. Afterward, he also played for two Belgrade-based teams IMT and Radnički.

In the mid-1990s, Jokanović moved to South Africa. In 2006, he was a player-coach for the Tshwane Suns of the South African Premier League (PBL).

On 26 November 2006, Jokanović died shortly after leaving the court in a PBL match against Olympians in Johannesburg. He collapsed in a dressing room at halftime.

See also 
 List of KK Crvena zvezda players with 100 games played

References

External links
 Profile at afrobasket.com

1961 births
2006 deaths
KK Beobanka players
BKK Radnički players
KK Crvena zvezda players
KK IMT Beograd players
KK Sloboda Užice players
Player-coaches
Serbian expatriate sportspeople in South Africa
Serbian men's basketball coaches
Serbian men's basketball players
Shooting guards
South African men's basketball players
Sportspeople from Užice
Yugoslav men's basketball players
Date of birth missing